San Nicola di Myra is a Baroque-style, former Roman Catholic church located in the town of Andria, province of Barletta-Andria-Trani, Apulia, Italy.

History
The church at the site is documented since 1104, when the bishop granted the neighborhood of Trimoggia its own parish. It was initially refurbished in 1349 by Bertrando del Balzo, husband of Beatrice D’Angiò. In 1657, Duke Fabrizio IV Carafa patronized construction of the main altar, replacing one that had been placed by his ancestor, Ettore II Carafa.

The facade of the church was built in a late-baroque and early neoclassical style. The interior has a number of canvases by 
Vito Calò, a pupil of Corrado Giaquinto.

References

Churches in the province of Barletta-Andria-Trani
12th-century Roman Catholic church buildings in Italy
Roman Catholic churches completed in 1572
16th-century Roman Catholic church buildings in Italy